Järvenpää is a town and municipality in Finland. Neighbouring municipalities are Tuusula, Sipoo and Mäntsälä. People also refer to Kerava as Järvenpää's neighbour, even though they do not technically share a border, thanks to the one kilometre-wide land area that belongs to Tuusula.

History
Around this time, the village was documented to consist of eight estates. Prior to being transferred to the newly formed chapel of Tuusula in 1643, Järvenpää was part of the parish of Sipoo; Tuusula, in turn, became an independent pastorate in 1654.

While the population in Järvenpää had long been stagnant, it had started expanding again by the late 1700s, thanks to the evolution of agriculture at the time. In the middle of the 1800s, Järvenpää together with Nummenkylä formed the most populous village of Tuusula with around 450 inhabitants. Thanks to its location on the road between Helsinki and Mäntsälä, the village had grown into a minor concentration of commerce, with the presence of a  - a type of tavern - and several craftsmen. Thanks to these factors, one of the original intermediate stations of the Helsinki–Riihimäki railway was placed in Järvenpää.

Järvenpää was separated from its parent community Tuusula in 1951. Järvenpää was granted the status of a market town (kauppala) after the separation. Neighbouring districts Kellokoski and Nummenkylä were not added to the municipality of Järvenpää and the controversy over the issue still raises blood pressure fifty years later. In the event, Kellokoski remained part of the municipality of Tuusula. Bjarne Westermarck developed Järvenpää and is considered to be the founder of the town and was honored at its centennial celebrations by the release of a book about Järvenpää.
Järvenpää was granted full legal town (kaupunki) status in 1967.

Geography 

Järvenpää is divided into 25 neighbourhoods. The locations of individual neighbourhoods are shown on the map on the left.

 
 
 
 
 
 
 
 
 
 
 
 
 
 
 Haarajoki

Demographics 
In 2020, 16.8% of the population of Järvenpää was under the age of 15, 64.3% were aged 15 to 64, and 18.9% were over the age of 65. The average age was 41.3, under the national average of 43.4 but above the regional average of 41.0. Speakers of Finnish made up 92.5% of the population and speakers of Swedish made up 1.0%, while the share of speakers of foreign languages was 6.4%. Foreign nationals made up 4.2% of the total population.

In 2019, out of the total population of 43,711, the entire urban population of Järvenpää was localized in a single urban areas, the Helsinki central locality, with 42,940 inhabitants. 42 people lived in sparsely populated areas, while the coordinates of 729 people were unknown. This made Järvenpää's degree of urbanization 99.9%.

The chart below, describing the development of the total population of Järvenpää from 1975 to 2020, encompasses the municipality's area as of 2021.

Culture

In the early 20th century Järvenpää had a large artist community, including Jean Sibelius, Juhani Aho and Eero Järnefelt. This was partly true because of a railway connection to Helsinki.

Järvenpää is widely known as the location of Ainola, the home of the composer Jean Sibelius. It is situated about two kilometers south of the city centre. The composer moved with his family to the cottage designed by Lars Sonck on September 24, 1904, and he lived there until his death in 1957. Ainola is open for visitors in the summer months as the "museum of Sibelius".

Juhani Aho moved with his wife Venny Soldan-Brofeldt to Järvenpää in 1897. They lived there for fourteen years in a villa, called , next to the shore of Lake Tuusula. The villa was later called .

The K-Citymarket of Järvenpää was awarded the Grocery Store of the Year title in 2019 by the IGD of the United Kingdom.

Events

Events are held in the Järvenpää-talo (lit. Järvenpää-house) throughout the year: concerts, theatre and art-shows. The favorite-place of children is Pikku-Aino's home, where children can play, make shows and so on.

There is a musical event, which is arranged every year, called  (lit. Park Blues). "Blues-week" starts from the "Blues street" of the city centre, and concerts and informal sessions are arranged in bars and restaurants. The main concert is at the end of Blues-week, and is arranged in Vanhankylänniemi on the Saturday.

Järvenpää celebrates its 70th anniversary in 2021.

Transportation
The railroad goes through the city centre. In addition to the main railway station, there are the stations of Ainola, Saunakallio and Haarajoki.

The trip to Helsinki takes about half an hour, whether by rail or road, and to the airport of Helsinki-Vantaa about 20 minutes. Train connections to the capital are good. Uusimaa's trains leave the main station twice an hour, and from other stations once an hour.

Politics

Results of the 2021 Finnish municipal elections in Järvenpää:
Social Democratic Party: 21.1%
National Coalition Party: 20.5%
True Finns: 18.3%
Green League: 13.2%
Järvenpää Plus: 9,1%
Centre Party: 7.5%
Left Alliance: 5.2%
Christian Democrats: 3,1%

Management
Järvenpää belongs to Uudenmaan vaalipiiri (electoral district of Uusimaa) and its town council has 51 councillors.
The town council's political groups (2004–2008) were :
Suomen Sosialidemokraattinen Puolue (The Social Democratic Party of Finland) (14 councils),
Kokoomus (The National Coalition Party) (13),
Järvenpää 2000 Plus (7),
Keskusta (The Centre Party) (7),
Vihreä liitto (The Green League) (4),
Vasemmistoliitto (The Left Alliance) (3),
Kristillisdemokraatit (Christian Democrats) (1),
Suomen kommunistinen puolue (Communist Party of Finland) (1),
Liberaalit (Liberals) (1).

The president of the council was Ari Åberg (Kokoomus).

International relations

Twin towns — Sister cities
Järvenpää is twinned with:

 Buchholz in der Nordheide, Germany
 Jõgeva County, Estonia
 Lørenskog, Norway
 Pasadena, United States
 Rødovre, Denmark
 Täby, Sweden
 Vác, Hungary
 Volkhov, Russia

See also 
 Kellokoski
 Kerava
 Lake Tuusula
 Pornainen

References

External links 

 
 Town of Järvenpää – Official site
 Puistoblues festival

 
Greater Helsinki
Cities and towns in Finland
Populated places established in 1951
1951 establishments in Finland